The Beijing–Harbin, Beijing–Hong Kong (Macau) corridor is a high-speed rail passage connecting Harbin in Heilongjiang province to the Hong Kong and Macau Special Administrative Regions via Beijing. The passage will pass through the cities of Changchun, Shenyang, Beijing, Shijiazhuang, Zhengzhou, Wuhan, Changsha, and Guangzhou before splitting into two lines: one passing through Shenzhen before terminating at Hong Kong, the other passing through Zhuhai before terminating at Macau.

Announced in 2016 as part of the national "eight vertical and eight horizontal" high-speed railway network, the passage is essentially a merger of two lines previously under the pervious "Four Vertical and Four Horizontal" high-speed railway network: the Beijing–Harbin high-speed railway and the Beijing–Guangzhou–Shenzhen–Hong Kong high-speed railway, with the addition of the Guangzhou–Macau branch line. The Shenyang–Dalian railway section, initially considered part of the Beijing–Harbin high-speed railway, now forms part of the Coastal corridor, a different rail corridor.

Route

Main route (Harbin to Hong Kong)

Branch line (Guangzhou to Macau)

See also 
 High-speed rail in China

References 

High-speed rail in China
25 kV AC railway electrification